Henry Blount may refer to:

Henry Blount, 4th Earl of Newport (died 1679), English peer and member of the House of Lords
Henry Blount (knight) (1602–1682), English traveller, landowner and author

See also
Harry Blount (disambiguation)
Henry Blunt (disambiguation)
Blount (surname)